is a Welsh actor, from .

Early life
He graduated from the Royal Welsh College of Music & Drama in 2007.

Career
He began acting in the drama series  on S4C.

He won the Richard Burton Award at the National Eisteddfod in 2004.

Personal life
Dwyfor currently lives in London, he is a Welsh speaker, has blue/grey eyes and dark brown hair.

Works

Television
 A Very English Scandal - George Deakin
 Requiem - Ed
  - Jamie
  - Tom
  - John Iwan
 A470 - Silver

Film
 Basket Case (2009) - Jez
  (2002) - Stephen
 The Baker (2007) - Eggs
 I Know You Know (2008) - Paradise waiter
 Pride (2014) - Lee
  (2016) - Dan

Theatre
 Little Eagles, RSC - Yuri Gagarin
 Romeo & Juliet, RSC - Peter
 , RSC - Percival, Lamarak, Lavaine
 The Drunks, RSC - scene announcer, 1st Ilia
 The Comedy of Errors, RSC, The Swan Theatre, Stratford (2006) - Dromio of Ephesus
 As You Like It, RSC - William Silvius
 Six Characters in Search of an Author, Headlong Theatre - Son
 Hamlet, RSC - Laertes
 Fortune's Fool, The Old Vic (2013)
 Too Clever By Half, Royal Exchange Manchester (2013) - Gloumov
 Titus Andronicus, Globe Theatre (2014) - Lucius
 The Harvest, Ustinov Studio, Bath (2015) - Valerii
 Right Now, Ustinov Studio, Bath (2016) - François
 Richard III, Shakespeare's Rose Theatre, York (2018) - Richard III

References

External links
 
 

Alumni of the Royal Welsh College of Music & Drama
Welsh male television actors
Welsh male film actors
Welsh male stage actors
People educated at Ysgol Eifionydd, Porthmadog
People from Gwynedd
Living people
Year of birth missing (living people)